Sándor Eckschmiedt (born 25 October 1938) is a Hungarian athlete. He competed in the men's hammer throw at the 1964, 1968 and the 1972 Summer Olympics.

References

1938 births
Living people
Athletes (track and field) at the 1964 Summer Olympics
Athletes (track and field) at the 1968 Summer Olympics
Athletes (track and field) at the 1972 Summer Olympics
Hungarian male hammer throwers
Olympic athletes of Hungary
Athletes from Budapest
20th-century Hungarian people